Daniela Salazar is a Colombian former professional racing cyclist. She won the Colombian National Road Race Championships in 2009.

References

External links
 

Year of birth missing (living people)
Living people
Colombian female cyclists
Place of birth missing (living people)
21st-century Colombian women